Joseph Breck may refer to:

Joseph Breck (businessman) (1794–1873), Massachusetts businessman and gardener
Joseph Breck (curator) (1885–1933), assistant director of Metropolitan Museum of Art and director of The Cloisters
Joseph Berry Breck (1828–1865), U.S. Navy officer
Joseph Peter Breck (1929–2012), American character actor